Nelliharvi is a village in Dharwad district of Karnataka, India.

Demographics 
As of the 2011 Census of India there were 272 households in Nelliharvi and a total population of 1,410 consisting of 721 males and 689 females. There were 199 children ages 0-6.

References

Villages in Dharwad district